A small but damaging outbreak of 15 tornadoes impacted the Southeast on February 7, 2017. The most damaging tornado of the outbreak was a large and powerful EF3 tornado. The tornado caused considerable damage along its path and left approximately 10,000 homes without electricity. 33 injuries occurred in the area after the tornado hit near Chef Menteur Highway with hundreds of structures sustaining moderate to significant damage along the ten-mile path. In response to the disaster, Governor John Bel Edwards declared a state of emergency.

Other destructive and strong tornadoes occurred on this day as well, including an EF1 tornado that killed a man near Donaldsonville, Louisiana and another EF3 tornado that injured three and caused considerable damage to homes, trees, and power lines in Livingston Parish, Louisiana. Overall, the outbreak killed one and injured 40.

Meteorological synopsis

On February 4, the Storm Prediction Center (SPC) outlined a severe weather threat area across portions of the Ohio Valley southward into the northern Gulf Coast states. A corresponding Slight risk of severe weather was issued the following day from central Indiana and Ohio to northern Mississippi and Alabama, encompassed within a larger Marginal risk. Little change occurred for the 07:00 UTC Day 2 outlook, but the Marginal risk was eventually shifted to encompass portions of eastern Louisiana on the 17:30 UTC forecast. Early on February 7, the SPC expanded the Slight risk area and subsequently introduced a small Enhanced risk for portions of eastern Louisiana, southern Mississippi, southwestern Alabama, and the extreme western Florida Panhandle, although its intent was for the potential for large hail instead of significant tornadoes.

On February 7, an intensifying southern-stream shortwave trough progressed eastward from the southern Great Plains to the lower Mississippi Valley. Ahead of the trough, strong low- to mid-level winds transported abundant moisture northward from the Gulf of Mexico, with dewpoints reaching to lower to mid 60s °F. The combination of southwesterly flow and abnormally cold mid-level temperatures—approximately −14 °C (7 °F) to −17 °C (1 °F)—helped to destabilize the atmosphere, with maximum Convective Available Potential Energy values in the range of 1500–2000 j/kg. Veering winds—winds that turn clockwise with height—acted to lengthen hodographs and provide significant directional wind shear, with 0–6 km shear of 35–45 mph (55–75 km/h) and 0–3 km storm relative helicities of 200–300 m2/s2. Meanwhile, incredibly steep mid-level lapse rates near or above 8 C/km overspread the risk area. The increasingly conducive environment prompted the SPC to issue a tornado watch across southern Louisiana and Mississippi, valid from 7:55 a.m. CST (13:55 UTC) to 2:00 p.m. CST (21:00 UTC); forecasters assessed a 50% chance of two or more tornadoes in the watch box, but only a 20% chance of one or more strong (EF2+) tornadoes.

Confirmed tornadoes

February 7 event

New Orleans East–Lake Borgne, Louisiana

The tornado initially touched down along Old Gentilly Road to the east of the New Orleans Industrial Canal. EF0 damage was noted at the beginning of the path as homes sustained minor roof damage. EF1 damage occurred near Wilson Avenue as a two-story motel had much of its poorly attached roof uplifted and sustained buckling of exterior walls on the second floor. The tornado moved northeastward, attaining high-end EF2 intensity by the time it reached the Chef Menteur Highway (US 90). Metal power poles were bent, wooden power poles were snapped, a business was severely damaged, and an apartment complex sustained significant roof damage and collapse of a brick fascia exterior wall in this area. Damage surveys indicate that as the tornado continued on this northeastward track, it became multiple-vortex in structure, with a second circulation north of the first taking over as the predominant one. This second vortex, as the tornado did when it originally touched down, moved in a northeastward direction and produced EF2 damage near the Flake Street/Grant Avenue intersection. A small, poorly constructed home along Flake Street was rolled off of its cinder block foundation and completely destroyed, while nearby homes sustained shingle and porch damage. East of Crowder Boulevard, a continuous swath of mainly EF2 damage was noted as the now large and destructive tornado moved through residential areas, severely damaging numerous homes, many of which had their roofs ripped off. A few of these homes sustained some failure of exterior walls. Vehicles in this area were flipped and damaged, some of which were tossed into homes.

Along Grant Street, Schaumburg Elementary School sustained minor roof damage and broken windows as it was impacted by the outer edge of the circulation. Children inside the school took shelter in an interior hallway as the tornado struck and were not injured. Just east of this point, a large area of mid-range EF3 damage was observed. This damage was confined to an area along and just north of Grant Street between Read Boulevard and Chalmark Drive, where dozens of homes lost much to all of their roof structures and sustained collapse of multiple exterior walls. Large, two-story brick homes had only one or two interior corner walls left standing on their top floors, and a two-story apartment building sustained total roof loss and collapse of numerous second floor walls, with some collapse of first floor exterior walls noted as well. The tornado then caused high-end EF2 damage further to the east as it moved through additional residential areas. Many homes in this area had roofs torn off and sustained some collapse of exterior walls. A second small area of mid-range EF3 damage was noted near Hauck Drive, where a large church was left with only one exterior wall standing, and sustained total collapse of most interior walls.

The tornado essentially followed the Chef Menteur Highway as it continued eastward, significantly damaging homes and other structures at EF2 strength along this segment of the path. A small strip mall and a church sustained major roof damage and had every window blown out. A gas station was also heavily damaged and had its service station canopy shredded. Homes had their roofs completely removed, and many concrete light poles were snapped. A final segment of low-end EF3 damage occurred further east as several large metal power pylons along the highway were bent in half. High-end EF2 damage occurred in neighborhoods just north of the highway, as numerous homes sustained significant roof and exterior wall loss. Past Bullard Avenue, the tornado weakened to EF1 strength and the damage path shifted southward. Numerous small trees were snapped near the I-510 and Almonaster Avenue interchange. The tornado then restrengthened to EF2 intensity as it caused heavy damage to NASA's Michoud Assembly Facility. Windows were blown out, and large metal industrial buildings sustained major structural damage. The large, two-story office building that houses the National Finance Center suffered significant roof damage and collapse of both the brick facade and cinder block exterior walls in a few places. Vehicles in the National Finance Center parking lot were severely damaged. The tornado then continued eastward across unpopulated marshy areas before dissipating over Lake Borgne.

In all, the tornado significantly damaged or destroyed at least 638 homes and 40 businesses along its  path, and hundreds of trees and power poles were snapped. Thirty-three people were injured, six severely; however, no fatalities took place. Two public schools— Schaumburg Elementary and Einstein Charter School—both sustained some damage to buildings and property, with collective damage reaching $1.7 million. NASA's Michoud Assembly Facility suffered more than $1 million in damage. At the time, it was the strongest tornado to strike the New Orleans metropolitan area. However, it would be surpassed on March 22, 2022 by a high-end EF3 tornado, which killed one person and injured multiple others as it caused considerable damage in Arabi.

See also
List of North American tornadoes and tornado outbreaks
Tornado outbreak of February 23–24, 2016
Tornado outbreak of December 16–17, 2019
Tornado outbreak of March 21–23, 2022

Notes

References

F3 tornadoes
2017 in Tennessee
2017 in Louisiana
2017 in Alabama
2017 in Georgia (U.S. state)
2017 in Mississippi
2017 in Kentucky
2017 in Florida
2017 natural disasters in the United States
February 2017 events in the United States
2017 tornado
Tornadoes in Tennessee
Tornadoes in Louisiana
Tornadoes in Alabama
Tornadoes in Georgia (U.S. state)
Tornadoes in Mississippi
Tornadoes in Kentucky
Tornadoes in Florida
Tornadoes of 2017